Khalil Sakakini (23 January 1878 – 13 August 1953) was a Palestinian Orthodox Christian teacher, scholar, poet, and Arab nationalist.

Biography

Khalil Sakakini was born into a Palestinian Christian family in Jerusalem on 23 January 1878. He received his schooling in Jerusalem at the Greek Orthodox school, at the Anglican Christian Mission Society (CMS) College founded by Bishop Blyth, and at the Zion English College where he read Literature. 

Later, Sakakini traveled to the United Kingdom and from there to the United States to join his brother Yusif, an itinerant salesman living in Philadelphia. During his nine-month stay in America, Khalil Sakakini wrote for Arabic literary magazines on the East Coast, and did translations for Professor Richard Gottheil at Columbia University. He supported himself by teaching Arabic and working in a factory in Maine; he also worked as a street vendor. Upon his return in 1908, Khalil Sakakini worked as a journalist for the Jerusalem magazine Al-Asmai''' and  taught Arabic at the Salahiyya school and tutored expatriates at the American Colony. He also contributed to Al Nafais Al Asriyyah, a literary magazine based in Jerusalem. 

Sakakini's wife, Sultana, died in October 1939 and was buried in the Greek Orthodox cemetery on Mount Zion. He mourned her for the rest of his days, and wrote poems eulogizing her. His son, Sari, completed his Master's degree at the University of Michigan and returned to Jerusalem, to work for the American consulate.

During the 1948 Arab-Israeli War, the Sakakinis were one of the last families to leave the  Katamon neighborhood. A few days before the city was divided, the Sakakini family fled to Cairo.  There, Khalil Sakakini was nominated by the Egyptian writer Taha Hussein to join the Arabic Language Academy.

Sari Sakakini's sudden death of a heart attack in 1953 at the age of 39 was a devastating blow. Khalil Sakakini died three months later, on 13 August 1953. Sakakini's two daughters, Dumya and Hala, lived together in Ramallah until their deaths, in 2002 and 2003, respectively. The two sisters had long careers in education. Hala Sakakini edited her father's journals, published in 1955, and wrote two memoirs in English, Jerusalem and I and Twosome''.

Pedagogic career

In 1909, Khalil Sakakini founded the Dusturiyyah school or National School, which became known for its Arab nationalist approach. Sakakini pioneered a progressive education system: no grades, prizes or punishments for the students, and emphasis being placed on music, education and athletics. He also introduced new methods of teaching Arabic, and made it the primary language of instruction instead of Turkish.

Wasif Jawhariyyeh, noted for his memoirs of early 20th century Jerusalem, was a pupil of his in the Dusturiyyah School. He praised Sakakini's education style.

Sakakini led a movement to reform and change into a more Arab approach to what he considered to be a corrupt Greek Orthodox Church of Jerusalem, and wrote a pamphlet in 1913 titled "The Orthodox Renaissance in Palestine", which led to his excommunication from the Greek Orthodox Church. Ottoman authorities arrested him on the last day of Ottoman Rule in Jerusalem in 1917, after he had sheltered a Polish-American Jew and fellow citizen of Jerusalem, Alter Levine. Both were sent to a prison in Damascus. Levine became an enemy when the United States joined the Allies of World War I. Even so,  Levine and  Sakakini became close friends during their incarceration. Upon his release, Sakakini boarded for a brief time with Musa Alami, a former pupil, and then joined the Arab Revolt, for which he composed its anthem.

In 1919, Khalil Sakakini and his wife began to work for the Educational Authority of Palestine in Jerusalem, and Sakakini was appointed head of the Jerusalem Teachers’ College. He later became Inspector for Education in Palestine, a post he held for 12 years, until his resignation in protest of the appointment of a Jew as High Commissioner of the Palestine Mandate, Herbert Samuel. After working as a  school principal in Cairo, he returned to Palestine in 1926 and became a school inspector. This allowed him to bring his educational philosophy to the rural villages. At the same time, he wrote political commentaries for the newspapers al-Muqtataf, al-Hilal and al-Siyassa al-Usbu'iyya, composed patriotic poems, and spoke at political rallies. In 1925, he founded the Wataniyya school, and in 1938 the Nahda College in Jerusalem. In May 1934, Sakakini built a home in the Katamon neighborhood which was completed in three years. In 1932, he sent his son Sari to Haverford College, Pennsylvania.

Views and opinions
Throughout his life Khalil Sakakini embraced European culture. Having a Greek grandmother led to an interest in Greek music and Greek philosophy. He even nicknamed himself "Socrates".

Sakakini expressed humanistic ideas and had a business card made out to read "Khalil Sakakini: human being, God willing." At the same time, he defined himself first and foremost as an Arab and was an "ardent" Arab nationalist hailed by some as one of the founding fathers of Arab nationalism of the region. He was an advocate of Pan-Arabism and envisaged Palestine united with "Greater Syria" (present-day Syria, Lebanon, Jordan, and Palestine). He saw Zionism as a great threat already before the First World War  and believed that the Jewish right to the land had expired while the Arab right was "a living one".

Sakakini, listing some of the punishments to be meted out: bomb and shoot the British and Jewish invaders, torch Jewish fields and orange groves, ambush routine traffic, block roads, derail trains, cut power lines. He continued: "The battle in Palestine is in full force... Victory is in the hands of God... If we live, we shall live with honor. If we die - we shall die with honor.

During the 1936–39 Arab revolt in Palestine, Khalil Sakakini applauded the Arab attacks on Jews, but worried that the violence looked bad in the eyes of the public because 'the Jews controlled the newspapers and radio'. Therefore, Sakakini had to conclude, that 'the sword was mightier than the book'. For a grenade attack on a Jewish civilian train, he praised the "heroes" responsible. After the attack on Jerusalem's Edison cinema that left three dead, he wrote:

"There is no other heroism like this, except the heroism of Sheikh al-Qassam".

"I feel the pain of the troubles, whether they fall on Arabs or on the English or on the Jews. For that reason you will sometimes find me on the side of the Arabs, at others times on the side of the English, and still other times on the side of the Jews. And if there were animals who suffered from even a faint whiff of these troubles, I would sometimes be on the side of the animals.  Khalil Sakakini also came to believe that Nazi Germany might weaken the British and 'liberate Palestine from the Jew', and therefore supported the Nazis. He wrote that Adolf Hitler had opened the World's eyes to Jewish world power, and that Germany had stood up to the Jews and put them in their place, much like Mussolini had done with the British.

Sakakini vehemently opposed allowing Holocaust survivors into Palestine, arguing that a human problem needed to be solved by all humanity. While saddened by events such as the Struma disaster, he felt that the passengers were in fact invaders. An independent Palestinian Arab government should have used force to prevent them from landing, and he felt that while elderly Jews could come to live out their last years as had happened in the past, a thriving Jewish community under British protection should be forbidden. Khalil Sakakini believed that the Holocaust was being exploited parasitically by Jews demanding a homeland in Palestine, who he said would throw the Arabs out as soon as they got their homeland. Due to the Jewish influence in the United States, he believed that their right to vote in that country should be revoked.

Sakakini was a lifelong advocate of social reform. He tried to inculcate principles of students' liberation, sex education, socialist and other progressive ideas, and believed in free mingling of the sexes.

Legacy
Khalil Sakakini's published work includes educational treatises, poetry collections, literary, philosophical and political essays, and his diaries. A street and a school in Jerusalem are named after him, the Jezzar Pasha Mosque's library in Acre as well as a street in Cairo. His publications are now at the Hebrew University of Jerusalem. He is buried in the Mar Gerges Cemetery in Cairo.

In 2001, the Khalil Sakakini Cultural Center successfully petitioned the municipality of Ramallah to rename the main thoroughfare nearest the center after Khalil Sakakini. That same year, the center began editing and publishing the diaries of Khalil Sakakini, which he kept from 1907 to 1952. The first volume of the projected eight volumes was published in 2003. In 2003 too, Sakakini's heirs bequeathed the center his valuable collection of publications, books, and personal effects. These are on display in the foyer of the Khalil Sakakini Cultural Center.

See also
 Palestinian Christians
 Arab nationalism

References

External links

Salim Tamari: A Miserable Year in Brooklyn; Khalil Sakakini in America, 1907 - 1908, in Jerusalem Quarterly,
Salim Tamari: The Vagabond Café and Jerusalem's Prince of Idleness, in Jerusalem Quarterly,
City of Ramallah Homepage
Khalil Sakakini Cultural Centre
 Emanuel Beska: Khalil al-Sakakini and Zionism before WWI, in Jerusalem Quarterly,

1878 births
1953 deaths
Anti-Zionism
Arab people in Mandatory Palestine
Palestinian educators
20th-century Palestinian poets
Palestinian political writers
Eastern Orthodox Christians from Palestine
People excommunicated by the Greek Orthodox Church
People from Jerusalem
Palestinian nationalists
Arabs in Ottoman Palestine
Palestinian Arab nationalists
Ottoman Arab nationalists
Palestinian male poets
20th-century male writers
Palestinian Christians